Chaos Divine is a progressive metal band from Perth, Western Australia. The band consists of vocalist David Anderton, guitarists Simon Mitchell and Ryan Felton, bassist Michael Kruit and Drummer Tim Stelter. Since 2005, the band has released an EP, three studio albums and two singles.

History 
The 2006 Ratio EP, which saw the band tour nationally, was publicly voted as the second-best Australian metal release of its year on Triple J's Full Metal Racket program.

In late 2008, Chaos Divine completed their debut full-length debut album Avalon, recorded at Melbourne's Sing-Sing Studios and released nationally through Firestarter Music. The album went on to win the WAM Song of the Year Award in the Heavy Rock/Metal category with the track '"Refuse the Sickness". 

Chaos Divine was also among the top-five finalists nominated for the Metal/Hardcore award at the National MusicOz awards held in Sydney and broadcast live to a national television audience, in both 2007 and 2008. Avalon was also voted in the top 10 international metal albums of the year by Triple J.

In 2009 the band joined the country's largest national music festival, the Big Day Out, and went on to tour Europe with an appearance at the Progpower Europe Festival in The Netherlands with a run of further dates through Belgium. Later that year, the band picked up five Australian Heavy Metal Awards (including best band) with a live performance at the Forum in Sydney during the awards show.

In just over four years, Chaos Divine have played alongside acts such as Slayer (USA), Fear Factory (USA), Devil Driver (USA), Static-X (USA), Obituary (USA), Mastodon (USA), Dark Tranquillity (SWE), Evergrey (SWE), Hacride (FRA) and Trivium (USA), to name only a few.

On 25 March 2011, the band released their second full-length album, The Human Connection through Firestarter Music and Distribution. Recorded in Perth, Western Australia, the album was mixed and mastered by producer Jens Bogren of Fascination Street Studio, Sweden (Opeth, Symphony X, Katatonia). 

On 9 September 2012, the band recorded and released a single containing a cover of the Toto smash hit "Africa". The single contained two b-side tracks, an acoustic version of the 2011 track "Beautiful Abyss" and a remix of the track "Astral Plane".

Following the late withdrawal of Volbeat at the Perth 2014 Soundwave Festival on 3 March 2014, Chaos Divine was added to the local line-up to perform at the festival.

The band released the first single from their third studio album entitled "Soldiers" on 31 October 2014. The single was recorded in Perth at Underground Studios and mixed and mastered by renowned music producer and engineer Forrester Savell.

The band's third studio album was released in March 2015 following a successful crowd-funding campaign which saw the band raise $15,000 towards the album's production and release.

Members 
 Ryan Felton – Lead guitar (2005–present)
 Simon Mitchell – Rhythm guitar (2005–present)
 Tim Stelter – Drums (2017–present)
 David Anderton – Lead vocals (2005–present)
 Michael Kruit – Bass guitar (2005–present)

Former members
 Chris Mitchell – Drums (2007–2008)
 Ben Mazzarol – Drums (2005–2007, 2008–2017)

Discography

Studio albums

EPs

Awards

WAM Song of the Year
The WAM Song of the Year was formed by the  Western Australian Rock Music Industry Association Inc. (WARMIA) in 1985, with its main aim to develop and run annual awards recognising achievements within the music industry in Western Australia.

 (wins only)
|-
| 2008
| "Refuse the Sickness"
| Heavy Rock/Metal Song of the Year
| 
|-
| 2014
| "Soldiers"
| Heavy Rock/Metal Song of the Year
| 
|-
| 2015/16
| "Badge of Honour"
| Heavy Rock/Metal Song of the Year
| 
|-

References

External links

www.chaosdivine.net

Western Australian musical groups
Musical groups established in 2005
Australian heavy metal musical groups